The Hassan Pasha Mosque (Masjid Hassan el-Basha), also referred to as the Pasha Mosque or the Grand Mosque, is a mosque located in Oran, Algeria. It was built in 1796 by order of Baba Hassan, Pasha of Algiers, in memory of the expulsion of the Spanish. During the French Invasion of Algiers in 1830, French soldiers would occupy the mosque during their invasion of Algeria as their living-quarters. 5 years after the French Invasion, in 1835, the building was established as a mosque and renovated three decades later. In 1952, the mosque was listed as a historic monument. Since 2010, this historic monument has been closed to the public.

Gallery

See also
 Lists of mosques
 List of mosques in Africa
 List of mosques in Algeria
 List of cultural assets of Algeria

References

Mosques in Oran
Mosques completed in 1796
Mosque buildings with domes
1796 establishments in the Ottoman Empire
1796 establishments in Africa
18th-century religious buildings and structures in Algeria